The 2003 Rolex 24 at Daytona was a Grand-Am Rolex Sports Car Series 24-hour endurance sports car race held on February 1–2, 2003 at the Daytona International Speedway road course. The race served as the first round of the 2003 Rolex Sports Car Series. The race saw the debut of the Daytona Prototype as the new top class of the series. However, the new cars proved only marginally faster than the lower classes and suffered frequent mechanical failures during the race, allowing a car from the GT class to take overall victory. Overall victory and victory in the GT class went to the No. 66 Porsche 996 GT3-RS from The Racer's Group, driven by Kevin Buckler, Michael Schrom, Jörg Bergmeister, and Timo Bernhard. The Daytona Prototype class was won by the No. 88 Multimatic MDP1 from Multimatic driven by Scott Maxwell, David Brabham, and David Empringham. The SRP II class was won by the No. 5 Lola-Nissan from Team Seattle/Essex Racing, driven by Ross Bentley, Don Kitch Jr., Joe Pruskowski, and Justin Pruskowski. Finally, the GTS class was won by the No. 24 Mosler MT900 from Perspective Racing, driven by Jérôme Policand, Michel Neugarten, João Barbosa, and Andy Wallace.

Race results
Class winners in bold.

External links
 Official Race Results
 Car Information & Images

24 Hours of Daytona
2003 in American motorsport
2003 in sports in Florida